Chas Henry (born January 6, 1989) is a former American football punter.  Henry played college football for the University of Florida, earned consensus All-American honors, and was recognized as the best college punter as a senior.  He was signed by the Philadelphia Eagles as an undrafted free agent in 2011.

Early years 

Henry was born in Dallas, Georgia.  He attended East Paulding High School in Dallas, and he played high school football for the East Paulding Raiders.  Henry holds the school record for longest punt (66 yards) and led the Raiders to the state semi-finals as quarterback by throwing for 17 touchdowns and more than 1,700 yards.

College career 

Henry accepted an athletic scholarship to attend the University of Florida in Gainesville, Florida, where he played for coach Urban Meyer's Florida Gators football team from 2007 to 2010.  As a sophomore in 2008, Henry was a member of the Gators' BCS National Championship team.

During his senior season in 2010, Henry punted 50 times for 2,253 yards (a 45.1-yard average), including his season-best punt of 75 yards.  Sixteen of his punts landed inside the 20-yard line and only thirteen were fair caught.  Memorably, Henry also assumed place-kicking duties when starting place kicker Caleb Sturgis was injured, and kicked the 37-yard, game-winning field goal in the Gators' 34–31 overtime victory over the rival Georgia Bulldogs while several Bulldog assistant coaches attempted to distract him from the sideline.

Following the 2010 regular season, Henry was recognized as a consensus first-team All-American, and received the Ray Guy Award, awarded to the best punter in college football.  He was one of three finalists for the award in 2009, and one of ten semifinalists in 2008.

Professional career

Philadelphia Eagles 

After he was not selected in the 2011 NFL Draft, Henry signed as an undrafted free agent with the Philadelphia Eagles.  He opened the 2011 NFL season as the Eagles' starting punter.  Henry committed a Monday Night Football blunder against the Chicago Bears in a Week 9 loss, in which he botched a fake punt, and his pass was underthrown.

Henry was released by the Eagles on September 25, 2012.

Tampa Bay Buccaneers 

Henry was signed by the Buccaneers on February 13, 2013, and was competing for the starting spot against Michael Koenen.  Henry was cut by Tampa Bay on August 31, 2013.

See also 

 2008 Florida Gators football team
 2010 College Football All-America Team
 List of Florida Gators football All-Americans
 List of University of Florida alumni

References

External links 
  Chas Henry – Tampa Bay Buccaneers player profile
  Chas Henry – Florida Gators player profile
  Chas Henry – Philadelphia Eagles player profile

1989 births
Living people
All-American college football players
American football punters
Florida Gators football players
People from Dallas, Georgia
Philadelphia Eagles players
Players of American football from Georgia (U.S. state)
Sportspeople from the Atlanta metropolitan area